A Boy... a Girl is a 1969 film directed by John Derek.

Plot
A boy of 15, name unknown, becomes attracted to a similarly young and anonymous girl and makes love for the first time. But despite his romantic feelings toward her, she is swayed away by an older, wealthier man who owns a stable of horses.

Cast
 Dean Paul Martin as The Boy (as Dino Martin Jr.)
 Airion Fromer as The Girl 
 Karen Steele as Elizabeth 
 Kerwin Mathews as Mr. Christian 
 Peggy Lipton

See also
 List of American films of 1969

References

External links

1969 drama films
1969 films
American drama films
Films directed by John Derek
Films with screenplays by John Derek
1960s English-language films
1960s American films